Lieutenant Colonel John Augustus Conolly VC (30 May 1829 – 23 December 1888), born in Celbridge, County Kildare, Ireland,  was an Irish recipient of the Victoria Cross, the highest and most prestigious award for gallantry in the face of the enemy that can be awarded to British and Commonwealth forces.

Early life and education
Conolly was a younger son of Edward Michael Conolly (an MP), by his wife Catherine Jane, daughter of Chambré Brabazon Ponsonby-Barker (also an MP). He was born in Ireland and educated in England at King Edward's School, Birmingham.

Award
Conolly was 25 years old, and a lieutenant in the 49th Regiment of Foot, British Army during the Crimean War when the following deed took place for which he was awarded the VC.

On 26 October 1854 at Sebastopol, the Crimea, an attack by the Russians was repulsed and the enemy fell back pursued by men of the 49th Regiment, led by Lieutenant Conolly, whose gallant behaviour was most conspicuous in this action.  He ultimately fell, dangerously wounded, while in personal encounter with several Russians, in defence of his post.

Later life
Conolly eventually achieved the rank of lieutenant colonel. He died in Curragh, County Kildare, on 23 December 1888 and is buried in Mount Jerome Cemetery.

Personal life
Conolly married Ida Charlotte, a daughter of Edwyn Burnaby, by whom he had several children. His son, John Richard Arthur Conolly, was a member of parliament in Western Australia.

Medal
Conolly's Victoria Cross is on display at the Guards Museum, London.

References

Listed in order of publication year 
The Register of the Victoria Cross (1981, 1988 and 1997)

Ireland's VCs (Dept of Economic Development, 1995)
Monuments to Courage (David Harvey, 1999)
Irish Winners of the Victoria Cross (Richard Doherty & David Truesdale, 2000)

External links
Location of grave and VC medal (Dublin)
 

Crimean War recipients of the Victoria Cross
British Army personnel of the Crimean War
Irish recipients of the Victoria Cross
49th Regiment of Foot officers
Coldstream Guards officers
Burials at Mount Jerome Cemetery and Crematorium
1829 births
1888 deaths
19th-century Irish people
Irish officers in the British Army
People from County Kildare
British Army recipients of the Victoria Cross